Vafeika (also Βαφαίικα) is a settlement located approximately four kilometers from Genisea in the Xanthi regional unit of Greece. It is part of the community of Genisea.

External links
Greek Travel Pages - Vafeika

Populated places in Xanthi (regional unit)